In Gorbachev We Trust was the second album by the Scottish band The Shamen, released in 1989. It was an important landmark in The Shamen's transition from the psychedelic rock of Drop to the electronic dance music that would shortly bring them chart success. The "Gorbachev" of the album's title is Mikhail Gorbachev, the leader of the Soviet Union from 1985 to 1991.

Track listing
 Synergy
Including the famous lyrics, "MDMA-zing... we are together in ecstasy"
 Sweet Young Thing
A cover of the Goffin/King/Nesmith song from the album The Monkees (1966)
 Raspberry Infundibulum
An infundibulum is a funnel-shaped cavity or organ.
 War Prayer
Mark Twain's "The War Prayer" set to music and layered with Cold War-era samples, such as "God will destroy Russia"
Adam Strange
"Adam Strange is in my brain, I'm so glad to know him". "Adam" is a near-anagram of, and a slang term for, MDMA
Jesus Loves Amerika (Fundamental)
Transcendental
Misinformation
Raptyouare
In Gorbachev We Trust
Yellow Cellophane Day
Mayhew Speaks Out
Samples of Christopher Mayhew MP, who in 1955 took a mescaline trip as part of an experiment for BBC Television.

1999 reissue
In Gorbachev We Trust was reissued in 1999 on the Sequel label, with 3 extra tracks: "Long Gone", "Fire Engine", and "Knature Of A Girl".

References

See also
The Shamen discography

1989 albums
The Shamen albums
Cultural depictions of Mikhail Gorbachev